"Roses" is a song by American hip hop duo OutKast. It was released on March 1, 2004, as the third single from their 2003 double album, Speakerboxxx/The Love Below. It appears on André 3000's The Love Below disc and is the only track on his disc to feature Big Boi. The track was largely popular in the United Kingdom and the United States, peaking at number four on the UK Singles Chart and number nine on the Billboard Hot 100. It also found popularity in Australia, reaching number two on the Australian Singles Chart.

Music video
The video references the stage musicals West Side Story and Grease, and features cameo appearances from Paula Abdul, Lukas Haas, Kevin McDonald, Fonzworth Bentley, members of the Dungeon Family, Katt Williams, Faizon Love, and DeRay Davis.

A man is flipping through a Stankonia yearbook and sees the photo of Caroline Jones represented as the school's "Biggest Flirt". After Caroline leaves the bathroom with her girls, Big Boi is shown with his crew, appearing as stereotypical jocks. He opens a response to the note he gave to Caroline, asking if she'd be his valentine. Rather than checking off the Yes or No boxes, she writes "Maybe". Upset, Big Boi calls his crew to ride with him to school.

André 3000 is shown to be heading a musical on stage, where he sings the song and parodies Caroline, though Caroline is oblivious. During this time, Big Boi's crew, Speakerboxxx, drives to the school, performing acts of vandalism such as knocking down mailboxes. When Big Boi crashes the auditorium where the play is under way, Speakerboxxx announces their arrival, which is followed by the men on the stage announcing themselves as the Love Below.

Despite the pleas of the principal for no fighting, the two groups confront each other in the middle of the auditorium. Most of the students wind up in the fight, including the principal himself (played by Kevin McDonald). Big Boi moves away from the fight and directs his rap to an uncaring Caroline. In the end, an effeminate man (played by Katt Williams) hands Caroline a red rose and pleads with her to leave. They pause, take a look at the chaos behind them, and depart. André 3000 is carried off. The yearbook reader falls asleep after finishing the story.

Track listings

US 12-inch single
A1. "Roses" (radio edit) – 4:14
A2. "Roses" (instrumental) – 4:43
B1. "Roses" (club mix) – 6:14
B2. "Roses" (a cappella) – 5:25

US 7-inch single
A. "Roses" (radio mix) – 4:14
B. "Roses" (instrumental) – 4:43

UK CD and 12-inch picture disc single
 "Roses" (album version)
 "Church"

Australian CD single
 "Roses" (radio edit) – 4:14
 "Roses" (album version) – 6:09
 "Roses" (instrumental) – 4:43
 "Roses" (video)

Charts

Weekly charts

Year-end charts

Certifications

Release history

References

2003 songs
2004 singles
Arista Records singles
Bertelsmann Music Group singles
LaFace Records singles
Music videos directed by Bryan Barber
Outkast songs
Songs written by André 3000
Songs written by Big Boi